WCDC may refer to:

 WCDC (AM), a radio station (950 AM) licensed to serve Moncks Corner, South Carolina, United States
 WCDC-TV, a defunct television station (channel 36) formerly licensed to serve Adams, Massachusetts, United States
 Wan Chai District Council, the district council for the Wan Chai District in Hong Kong